The blackedge cusk (Ophidion muraenolepis) is a fish species in the family Ophidiidae.

References

blackedge cusk
Marine fish of Northern Australia
Fish of the Philippines
Fish of Taiwan
Fish of Hawaii
blackedge cusk
blackedge cusk